The cultural rights movement has provoked attention to protect the rights of groups of people, or their culture, in similar fashion to the manner in which the human rights movement has brought attention to the needs of individuals throughout the world.

Protecting a culture
Cultural Rights are rights related to art and culture, both understood in a large sense. The objective of these rights is to guarantee that people and communities have an access to culture and can participate in the culture of their selection. Cultural rights are human rights that aim at assuring the enjoyment of culture and its components in conditions of equality, human dignity and non-discrimination. They are rights related to themes such as language; cultural and artistic production; participation in cultural life; cultural heritage; intellectual property rights; author's rights; minorities and access to culture, among others. Focusing less on the preservation of cultures as an end in itself and more on the realization of "ecological" relations between cultural groups as a condition for equitable interactions and the potential for organic cultural change, Meyjes proposes the interchangeable terms cultural justice  and ethno-cultural justice and intercultural justice — which he defines as the principle of maximally accommodating the culturally-specific values and practices of minority groups and their members, in the form of rights, within the overall legal, regulatory, or policy limits of the institution, community, or society concerned (also see universalization).

Ethnic Groups Cultural preservation
Cultural rights of groups focus on such things as religious and ethnic minorities and indigenous societies that are in danger of disappearing. Cultural rights include a group's ability to preserve its way of life, such as child rearing, continuation of language, and security of its economic base in the nation, which it is located. The related notion of indigenous intellectual property rights (IPR) has arisen in attempt to conserve each society's culture base and essentially prevent ethnocide.

The cultural rights movement has been popularized because much traditional cultural knowledge has commercial value, like ethno-medicine, cosmetics, cultivated plants, foods, folklore, arts, crafts, songs, dances, costumes, and rituals. Studying ancient cultures may reveal evidence about the history of the human race and shed more light on our origin and successive cultural development. However, the study, sharing and commercialization of such cultural aspects can be hard to achieve without infringing upon the cultural rights of those who are a part of that culture.

Cultural rights should be taken into consideration also by local policies. In that sense, the Agenda 21 for culture, the first document with worldwide mission that advocates establishing the groundwork of an undertaking by cities and local governments for cultural development, includes as cultural rights as one of the principles and states: “Local governments recognize that cultural rights are an integral part of human rights, taking as their reference the Universal Declaration of Human Rights (1948)”.

Cultural anthropology
"Cultural rights are vested not in individuals but in groups, such as religious and ethnic minorities and indigenous societies." All cultures are brought up differently, therefore cultural rights include a group's ability to preserve its culture, to raise its children in the ways it forebears, to continue its language, and to not be deprived of its economic base by the nation in which it is located."  Anthropologists sometimes choose not to study some cultures beliefs and rights, because they believe that it may cause misbehavior, and they choose not to turn against different diversities of cultures. Although anthropologists sometimes do turn away from studying different cultures they still depend a lot on what they study at different archaeological sites.

See also
Collective rights
Ethnic group
Human rights
Minority group
Right to science and culture

References

External links
 Cultural Rights in the 20th Century", BBC Radio 4 discussion with Homi Bhabha and John Gray (In Our Time, Dec. 10. 1998)

Cultural studies
Human rights